The TRA bus network covers the Seine-Saint-Denis department in the Île-de-France region. It is operated by Transports Rapides Automobiles, which is owned by Transdev and is a member of Optile (Organisation Professionnelle des Transports d'Île-de-France).

A 6-month trial of on-demand bus services was carried out from March to August 2018 by Île-de-France Mobilités (IDFM) in the outer suburbs. The service, which operated from 2200 at night, enabled passengers to alight between 2 bus stops, reducing the need to walk to their intended destination as well as to combat gender-based harassment in public transportation. A total of 11 routes were involved, consisting of the Mélibus network in Seine-et-Marne (7 routes) and the TRA network (4 routes: 602, 607, 618 and 620) in Seine-Saint-Denis. Due to its positive feedback, IDFM had authorised Transdev to extend the trial to 50 other routes in Île-de-France in 2019.

Network 

TRA operates 22 numbered routes from 602 to 644 mainly in the department of Seine-Saint-Denis, and to a smaller extent, Seine-et-Marne. 4 routes are designated as Mobilien routes, 602, 609, 613, and 615. These routes have a higher frequency as well as longer operating hours to serve the dense urban areas of Île-de-France to provide an alternative to cars in the suburbs.

Gallery

References 

Transport in Île-de-France
Bus companies of France
Transdev